Ateleta is a comune and town in the province of L'Aquila in the Abruzzo region of central-southern Italy.

References

Cities and towns in Abruzzo